664 is an area code within Mexico's National Phone Numbering Schema (Plan Nacional de Numeracion). It covers the municipality of Tijuana, Baja California. It overlays area code 663.

Calls to numbers with the Mexican area code 664 must be dialed as any other international call, using the international call prefix, and the country code 52.

Telephone numbers in Mexico